3309 Brorfelde, provisional designation , is a nearly spheroidal, binary Hungaria asteroid from the inner regions of the asteroid belt, approximately 4 kilometers in diameter. It was discovered on 28 January 1982, by Danish astronomers Kaare Jensen and Karl Augustesen at the Brorfelde Observatory near Holbæk, Denmark. It was named for the discovering observatory and the village where it is located.

Orbit and classification 

Brorfelde is a bright stony asteroid and member of the Hungaria family, which form the innermost dense concentration of asteroids in the Solar System. It orbits the Sun at a distance of 1.7–1.9 AU once every 2 years and 5 months (895 days). Its orbit has an eccentricity of 0.05 and an inclination of 21° with respect to the ecliptic. The body's observation arc begins with its official discovery observation, as no precoveries were taken, and no prior identifications were made.

Physical characteristics 

On the SMASS taxonomic scheme, Brorfelde is a common stony S-type asteroid.

Photometry 

Between 2005 and 2010, astronomers Brian Warner and Petr Pravec obtained a large number of rotational lightcurves of Brorfelde. Best rated lightcurve analysis gave a rotation period between 2.5041 and 2.5046 hours with a brightness amplitude between 0.09 and 0.13 in magnitude, indicating that the body has a nearly spheroidal shape.

These results superseded photometric observations taken by Wiesław Z. Wiśniewski in the 1990s, and by Federico Manzini and René Roy in 2005 and 2009, respectively, as well as observations taken at the Palomar Transient Factory in 2010, which gave an incorrect period solution of more than 9 hours.

Satellite 

During the photometric observation in 2005, it was revealed that Brorfelde is a binary asteroid. In January 2014, repeated observations by Brian Warner confirmed a period of 2.503 and 18.51 hours for the primary and secondary, respectively, with several online-published lightcurve plots.

Diameter and albedo 

According to the survey carried out by NASA's Wide-field Infrared Survey Explorer with its subsequent NEOWISE mission, Brorfelde measures 3.78 kilometers in diameter, and its surface has an albedo of 0.46 (most recent result only). The Collaborative Asteroid Lightcurve Link derives an albedo of 0.2747 and a diameter of 3.91 kilometers with an absolute magnitude of 14.062.

Naming 

This minor planet was named on the occasion of the Brorfelde Observatory's 40th anniversary. Brorfelde was the observatory's first minor planet discovery. The approved naming citation was published by the Minor Planet Center on 7 September 1987.

Notes

References

External links 
 Lightcurve plot of 3309 Brorfelde, Palmer Divide Observatory, B. D. Warner (2009)
 (3309) Brorfelde, datasheet, johnstonsarchive.net
 Asteroids with Satellites, Robert Johnston, johnstonsarchive.net
 Asteroid Lightcurve Database (LCDB), query form (info )
 Dictionary of Minor Planet Names, Google books
 Asteroids and comets rotation curves, CdR – Observatoire de Genève, Raoul Behrend
 Discovery Circumstances: Numbered Minor Planets (1)-(5000) – Minor Planet Center
 
 

003309
Discoveries by Karl Augustesen
Named minor planets
003309
003309
19820128